Spinney Hills is in East Quogue, New York on the eastern end of the Long Island Central Pine Barrens region. It is sometimes used as a hiking, hunting, and off-roading area for dirt bikers, quadders, paintballers, and four-wheelers that includes miles of trails with near beach sand consistency.

Spinney Hills gets its name because of Spinney Road, which used to connect the East Quogue side of the hills to Sears Bellows County Park and Flanders (home of the Big Duck) to the north prior to the construction of the Sunrise Highway New York State Route 27. 

This region was created by glacial deposits of rock and sand during the last ice age. The sandy soil also absorbs most rainfall so there are few ponds or rivers in the area. There is a shallow glacial well in Spinney Hills known as an aquifer, which is where most of the rainfall in the region is stored. 

These hills are the continuation of a long east west ridge of hills known as the Ronkonkoma Moraine, which form the 'backbone' of Long Island. Much of this region is undeveloped other than a sand mine to the west and Southampton Pines to the east. There have been legal disputes between private real estate companies and the Town of Southampton over the future of the area, being it is one of the last expanses of wilderness left on Long Island. 

There is a large native population of white-tailed deer in the region due to lack of natural predators. In the higher elevations small sections of the hills have an almost alpine-desert look, with sandy open plateaus and extremely dwarfed vegetation. The Dwarf Pitch Pine which dominate the region grow not much taller than twenty feet in height due to dry, nutrient-poor soil. 

There is a desert effect in the Pine Barrens, with relatively higher daytime temperatures and cooler nighttime temperatures than the coast, only a few miles away. There are views of the Atlantic Ocean and Peconic Bay from certain peaks in the area.

External links
Pinebarrens.org
state.ny.us

Landforms of Suffolk County, New York
Southampton (town), New York
Hills of New York (state)